Idi Maa Ashokgadi Love Story is a 2003 Telugu film directed by Suresh Krishna and starring Siva Balaji and Kanchi Kaul in the lead roles.

Cast
 Siva Balaji as Bujji / Ashok Varma
 Kanchi Kaul as Mahalakshmi
 Swetha Agarwal as Deepali
 Manoj Biddvai as Vinod
 Chandra Mohan
 Vizag Prasad
 Siva Reddy
 Uttej
 Shanoor Sana

Soundtrack

References

External links
 Movie Details
 Movie Songs

2002 films
2000s Telugu-language films
Films directed by Suresh Krissna
Films scored by Anand–Milind